Malu is a type of Samoan tattoo.

Malu may also refer to:

People 
 Malú (born 1982), Spanish singer
 Jonathan Malu (born 1993), basketball player
 Malu Dreyer (born 1961), German politician
 Malu Trevejo (born 2002), Cuban-American singer

Places

Romania 
 Malu, Giurgiu, a commune in Giurgiu County
 Malu, a village in Bârla Commune, Argeș County
 Malu, a village in Godeni Commune, Argeș County
 Malu, a village in Sfântu Gheorghe Commune, Ialomiţa County
 Malu, a village in Stoilești Commune, Vâlcea County

Elsewhere 
 Malu, Queensland, a locality in Australia
Malu, Shanghai, China
Malu Station, Shanghai Metro
Malu, Nepal
Malu'u, a village in the Solomon Islands

See also 
 Malu Roșu (disambiguation)
 Malu Vânăt (disambiguation)